Angelo Carrara (born 13 December 1954) is an Italian biathlete. He competed in the 20 km individual event at the 1980 Winter Olympics.

References

External links
 

1954 births
Living people
Italian male biathletes
Olympic biathletes of Italy
Biathletes at the 1980 Winter Olympics
Sportspeople from the Province of Bergamo